Karthik Krishnan is an Indian-American business executive and the former global chief executive officer (CEO) of Britannica Group. He is an adjunct professor at Stern School of Business, New York University. 
An NACD-certified board director, Karthik was profiled by the Financial Times Agenda Week in their Diversity 100 publication.

Early life and education

Krishnan was born and raised in Chennai, Tamil Nadu. He did his schooling at G.K Shetty Vivekananda Vidyalaya, Ambattur, and T.I. Matriculation Higher Secondary School, Ambattur. He went to Coimbatore Institute of Technology and graduated in 1995 with a bachelor's degree in engineering. In 2006, he received his master's degree in business administration from Stern School of Business, New York.

Career
He started his career as a software engineer working on emerging internet applications and then moved on to work as a digital strategy and transformation consultant for Rodale, Inc.

In 2006, Krishnan joined RELX (formerly Reed Elsevier) as Vice President of Interactive Media and Sales. He then went on to lead the  channel at Elsevier, Inc. as Senior Vice President and General Manager for Global Pharma Business and e-commerce, and finally led its Global Clinical Reference & Workflow business.

He joined Britannica in November 2017. He introduced Britannica Insights, a Google Chrome browser extension, and then  Britannica School Insights, which supplied comparable content for subscribers of Britannica’s online classroom solutions and a partnership with YouTube on various conspiracy theories at the platform.  

Britannica LumieLabs was launched in early 2019 and won the Teacher's Desire award for Classroom. LumieLabs helps students become "digital storytellers".

Krishnan launched Guardians of History in the fall of 2019 . It is a voice and AI-driven choose-your-own-adventure for kids. This resulted in Britannica being recognized as a Top 20 brand in voice innovation.    

Krishnan has also authored published articles on various technology and education-based topics. 
He has been listed among the Top 100 global influencers in EdTech by EdTech Digest.

Published articles
World Economic Forum
 Augmented Intelligence: Human-Centric Approach to AI
 Three Vital Skills for the Disruptive Age
 Our Education System Is Losing Its Relevance. Let's Unleash Its Potential

Forbes
 Spot Top Talent with LID: Learning Agility, Initiative and Drive

The Hill
 A Case for Investment in Early Childhood Education

IMD
 ESG Primer for Business Leaders

References

External links
 Brittanica board of directors

New York University Stern School of Business alumni
Year of birth missing (living people)
Living people